Honey is a studio album by American pop and country singer songwriter Bobby Goldsboro issued in March 1968 on the United Artists label. It reached #1 in the US Country Albums chart, #5 in the US Pop charts and #41 in the Canadian charts. It was also certified Gold by the RIAA.

The title track, "Honey", was his biggest hit in 1968, a tearjerker about the death of a man's young wife. The song, written by Bobby Russell, was recorded in one take. It became the largest-selling record in the world for 1968 and topped the Hot 100 for five weeks. A French-language version "Chérie" became a local hit in Canada.

Selections from this album have appeared in other collections.

Track listing

Side one 
"Honey" (Bobby Russell) – 3:58
"Run to Me" (Bobby Goldsboro) – 2:25
"With Pen in Hand” (Bobby Goldsboro) – 3:27
"Pardon Me Miss" (Bobby Goldsboro) – 2:40
"Why Don't You Believe Me" (Lew Douglas, King Laney, Ray Rodde) – 2:15

Side two 
"Pledge of Love" (Bobby Goldsboro) – 2:21
"Little Green Apples" (Bobby Russell) – 2:25
"Love Arrestor" (Bobby Goldsboro) – 2:43
"By the Time I Get to Phoenix" (Jimmy Webb) – 2:44
"Beautiful People" (Kenny O'Dell) – 2:20
"A Woman" (Larry Butler, John Hurley) – 2:11

Production
All tracks produced by Bob Montgomery except Side B Track 1 by Jack Gold
Side B, Track 1 arranged by Bill Justis
Tracks A1, A3, A5, B2, B4, B5 & B6 arranged by Don Tweedy
Tracks A2, A4 & B3 arranged by Ray Stevens

References 

1968 albums
United Artists Records albums
Bobby Goldsboro albums